Namrole Airport  is an airport on Buru island, which is one of the Maluku Islands in Indonesia.

The airport is operated and managed by the government.

Passengers 
In 2018, the airport served 24,574 passengers with 350 arrivals and 350 departures. It could serve ATR 42 aircraft.

Airlines and destinations

References

External links
Namrole Airport - Indonesia Airport global website
 

Airports in Maluku
Buru